Scrinium callimorphum is an extinct species of sea snail, a marine gastropod mollusk in the family Mitromorphidae.

Description
The length of the shell attains 16 mm. S. callimorphum was a carnivorous gastropod that was first recorded in the Eocene period

Distribution
This extinct marine species is endemic to New Zealand, and the surrounding areas.

References

 Maxwell, P.A. (2009). Cenozoic Mollusca. pp. 232–254 in Gordon, D.P. (ed.) New Zealand inventory of biodiversity. Volume one. Kingdom Animalia: Radiata, Lophotrochozoa, Deuterostomia. Canterbury University Press, Christchurch

External links
 "A.G. Beu and J.I. Raine (2009). Revised descriptions of New Zealand Cenozoic Mollusca from Beu and Maxwell (1990). GNS Science miscellaneous series no. 27." 

callimorphum
Gastropods described in 1917
Gastropods of New Zealand